Agakha may refer to:
Agakha, a diminutive of the Russian male first name Agav
Agakha, a diminutive of the Russian male first name Agavva